John Brennan may refer to:

Public officials
 Jack Brennan (born 1937), U.S. Marine officer and aide of Richard Nixon
 John Brennan (CIA officer) (born 1955), former CIA Director
 John P. Brennan (1864–1943), Democratic politician in the U.S. state of Ohio
 John Brennan Hussey (born 1934), former mayor of Shreveport, Louisiana
 John Joseph Brennan (1913–1976), Northern Ireland politician
 John Brennan (Irish senator) (1901–1977), Fianna Fáil politician
 John A. Brennan Jr. (born 1945), American lobbyist and Massachusetts politician

Sports
 J. J. Brennan (died 1944), Irish hurler
 John Brennan (Derry Gaelic footballer) (born 1942), Gaelic football manager and player
 John Brennan (Kerry Gaelic footballer), former Gaelic footballer
 Jack Brennan (footballer, born 1892) (1892–1942), English footballer for Bradford City and Manchester City
 John Brennan (American football) (1913–1982), American football player
 Jack Brennan (baseball) (1862–1914), American baseball catcher
 John Brennan (athlete) (1879–1964), American track and field athlete

Artists
 Johnny Brennan (born 1961), American actor, screenwriter and voice actor
 John Wolf Brennan (born 1954), Irish pianist, organist and composer

Other people
 John J. Brennan (businessman) (born 1954), chairman and CEO of The Vanguard Group
 John Calder Brennan (1908–1996), U.S. historian
 John Brennan (doctor) (c. 1768–1830), Irish doctor
 Sidney Czira (1889–1974), Irish journalist and revolutionary known by her pen name "John Brennan"
 John N. H. Brennan (1914–2010), Irish author, huntsman and solicitor
 John P. Brennan (priest), first American Catholic priest to declare bankruptcy
 John W. Brennan, United States Army general

See also
 John Brenan (disambiguation)
 John O'Brennan, Irish political scientist